Bixby Creek may refer to:

Bixby Creek (California)
Bixby Creek (Michigan)
Bixby Creek Bridge, bridge in California

See also
Bixby (disambiguation)